The pistole vz. 22 was the first Czech Army pistol of the inter-war period. The vz. 22 was based upon the work of Mauser designer Josef Nickl's Model 1915 handgun. Slovakia seized over seven thousand vz. 22s when it declared its independence from Czechoslovakia in March 1939.

See also 

 Weapons of Czechoslovakia interwar period

Notes

References

External links
 Overview of Ceska Zbrojovka History and Handgun Production

Semi-automatic pistols of Czechoslovakia
World War II infantry weapons
.380 ACP semi-automatic pistols